Andrés Gerard can refer to:

 Andrés Gerard Sr. (born 1924), Mexican Olympic sailor
 Andrés Gerard Jr. (born 1949), Mexican Olympic sailor